Robert Andrew "Bob" Vagg (born 2 February 1940) is an Australian former long-distance runner who competed in the 1964 Summer Olympics.

References

1940 births
Living people
Australian male long-distance runners
Olympic athletes of Australia
Athletes (track and field) at the 1964 Summer Olympics